The Buddhist Federation of Norway (Norwegian: Buddhistforbundet) is an umbrella organization for the different Buddhist groups in Norway.  It was founded in 1979 by two Buddhist groups (Rinzai Zen Senter and Karma Tashi Ling buddhistsamfunn) with the aim of creating an organization to deal with issues of common interest for all Norwegian Buddhists, and which could represent all the separate groups to the government. The main goal of Buddhistforbundet today is to foster communication and good relations between Buddhists of all traditions and groups, in order to promote Buddhist principles and practice in Norway.

Organizations within Buddhistforbundet
 Buddhasasana - Organization for those with an interest in the Theravada tradition
 Den thailandske buddhistforening - Organization building a Thai buddhist temple in Frogner
 Oslo buddhistsenter - In Oslo
 Det vietnamesiske buddhistsamfunn - A nationwide Vietnamese Buddhist community
 Dharmagruppen - Organization practicing meditation as taught by Nhat Hanh
 Dharma Sah - A group in Moss associated with the Lotus Sangha of World Social Buddhism
 Hridaya-gruppen - A Zen group in Oslo
 Karma Tashi Ling buddhistsamfunn - A community practicing Tibetan Buddhism
 Rinzai Zen Senter - A Japanese Zen centre in Oslo
 Stavanger buddhistiske forening - A meditation group in Stavanger, established April 29, 1998
 Tisarana - The Sri Lankan Buddhist association in Norway
'Den Burmesiske Theravada Buddhist Forrening' at Kløfta in Norway,

External links
 Buddhistforbundet's web site (Norwegian only)

Buddhist organizations in Europe
Buddhism in Norway
Religious organizations established in 1979